City of Trees may  refer to any city designated as a Tree City USA, a Tree City of the World, or a city that has been awarded the title "European City of the Trees". The following list includes nicknames for cities established prior to these initiatives, or by other means.

Currently nicknamed cities 

Atlanta, Georgia, United States 
Boise, Idaho, United States 
Buffalo, New York, United States
Burlingame, California, United States
Chico, California, United States
Claremont, California, United States – "The City of Trees and PhDs"
Fairway, Kansas, United States
Pleasant Grove, Utah, United States – "Utah's City of Trees"
Royal Oak, Michigan, United States
South Pasadena, California, United States
Sendai, Miyagi Prefecture, Japan 
Tustin, California, United States
Woodland, California, United States
Sylvania, Ohio, United States

Formerly nicknamed cities

Highland Park, Michigan, United States
Sacramento, California, United States

Other uses 
 City of Trees, a collection of essays by Sophie Cunningham
 City of Trees (film), a 2015 documentary film directed by Brandon Kramer

Trees